Vitaliy Kvashuk (born 1 April 1993) is a professional Ukrainian football player, who plays as a left winger for Aris Limassol.

Career
Kvashuk is a product of the youth team systems of Kyivan sportive schools. He made his debut for FC Metalurh entering as a second-half substitute against FC Dnipro Dnipropetrovsk on 1 December 2012 in the Ukrainian Premier League.

In June 2013 he signed a 3-year contract with another Ukrainian Premier League club - FC Zorya Luhansk.

In 2021 he played for Aris Limassol in Cypriot Second Division.

References

External links
Profile at FFU Official Site (Ukr)
Profile at All Players in ua (Ukr)

1993 births
Living people
Footballers from Kyiv
Ukrainian footballers
Association football midfielders
Ukrainian expatriate footballers
Ukrainian Premier League players
FC Metalurh Donetsk players
FC Zorya Luhansk players
FC Olimpik Donetsk players
FC Torpedo-BelAZ Zhodino players
FC Vitebsk players
FC Neman Grodno players
Sabah FC (Azerbaijan) players
FC Gomel players
FK RFS players
Aris Limassol FC players
Expatriate footballers in Belarus
Expatriate footballers in Azerbaijan
Expatriate footballers in Latvia
Expatriate footballers in Cyprus
Ukrainian expatriate sportspeople in Belarus
Ukrainian expatriate sportspeople in Azerbaijan
Ukrainian expatriate sportspeople in Latvia
Ukrainian expatriate sportspeople in Cyprus